On 10 March 2017, a Sikorsky S-76C++ helicopter on a private charter flight crashed in Istanbul, Turkey, killing all 7 people on board.

Background
The helicopter, operated by Swan Aviation for the private use of Eczacıbaşı Holding,  was scheduled to fly from Istanbul to the Bozüyük office of the company, located in northwestern Turkey.

The helicopter was carrying two pilots, one Turkish businessman of Eczacibasi group and four Russian guests of the company for a meeting at Bozuyuk facilities scheduled at noon.

The aircraft was a Sikorsky S-76C++, with tail number TC-HEZ, manufactured in 2008.

Crash
The helicopter had departed Istanbul-Atatürk Airport at 11:15 local time in heavy fog. Six minutes after the takeoff, it hit the Endem TV Tower and crashed onto the nearby State Road D100 highway. All seven people on board were killed.

Investigation
Directorate General of Civil Aviation informed the press that investigation is still ongoing, but poor visibility conditions and the heavy fog was probably the main cause of the accident. Additionally, it was not clear why the pilots were flying near the tower since it is clearly stated on maps as "no-fly" zone and most experienced pilots were already aware of the height and location of the tower.

References

External links
 Video of aftermath, seconds after crash

2017 in Istanbul
Aviation accidents and incidents in 2017
Aviation accidents and incidents in Turkey
Accidents and incidents involving the Sikorsky S-76
Aviation accidents and incidents involving controlled flight into terrain
March 2017 events in Europe
March 2017 events in Turkey